The Muslim Khatris are desandants of Khatri community in Indian subcontinent. They embraced Islam during medieval times. They are now mostly concentrated in Pakistan provinces of Punjab, Sindh, Azad Kashmir and Northern India. They use titles like Sheikh, Sultan, Khan, Kapoor, Malik, Arora etc and they’re further divided into different clans. The community is scattered through out Punjab and Kutch region, and found both as nucleated and extended family.

Origin  
They’re divided into different clans who adopted agriculture and business for their survival. Khatris are one of the business and land owning group in the subcontinent, though their claims of warrior history is doubted by various scholars.

History 
They trace their roots from ancient Kshatriyas of the Indian subcontinent. They’re divided into different clans. Most of the Muslim Khatris were warriors and chieftains during the medieval era, many were employed as generals & soldiers under Mughal Empire. They slowly adopted agriculture and business for their survival. Khatris are one of the land owning group in the subcontinent. They were designated as martial race by the British.

Saudagaran-e-Delhi 

In addition, the Qaume-e-Punjaban community of Delhi are also of Khatri ancestry. Historically, this community lived in Delhi, and other North Indian towns, but after the Partition of India, a lot of these people moved to Pakistan. In Pakistan also, the Muslim Khatris are engaged in various occupations.

Gujarat Sultanate 
As per some scholars, Zafar Khan the founder of Gujarat Sultanate was a Muslim Khatri while others say he was a Muslim Tank Rajput from Punjab. He rose to the nobility after marriage of his sister with Firuz Shah Tughlaq, the Delhi Sultan, and would become the Governor (Naib) of Gujarat under the Delhi Sultanate. Zafar Khan defeated Farhat-ul-Mulk near Anhilwada Patan and made the city his capital. Following Timur's invasion of the Delhi Sultanate, the city was devastated and weakened considerably, so he declared himself independent from Delhi in 1407, and formally established the Sultanate of Guzerat. The next sultan, his grandson Ahmad Shah I moved the capital to Ahmedabad in 1411. His successor Muhammad Shah II subdued most Rajput chieftains. The prosperity of the sultanate reached its zenith during the rule of Mahmud Begada. He also subdued most Gujarati Rajput chieftains and built a navy off the coast of Diu. In 1509, the Portuguese empire wrested Diu from the Sultanate in the battle of Diu (1509). The Moghul emperor Humayun attacked Gujarat in 1535 and briefly occupied it, during which Bombay, Bassein& Damaon would become a Portuguese colony, thereafter Bahadur Shah was killed by the Portuguese while making a deal in 1537. The end of the sultanate came in 1573, when Akbar annexed Sultanate of Guzerat into his empire. The last ruler Muzaffar Shah III was taken a prisoner to Agra. In 1583, he escaped from the prison and with the help of the nobles succeeded to regain the throne for a short period before being defeated by Akbar's general Abdul Rahim Khan-I-Khana.

References

Further reading
 

Surnames
Punjabi tribes
Social groups of Punjab, Pakistan